Terren is a given name. Notable people with the name include:

 Terren Jones (born 1991), American football player
 Terren Peizer (born 1959), American investment manager

Masculine given names